The 2012 Champion Hurdle was a horse race held at Cheltenham Racecourse on Tuesday 13 March 2012. It was the 82nd running of the Champion Hurdle.

The winner was The Festival Goers Rock On Ruby, a seven-year-old gelding trained by Paul Nicholls and ridden by Noel Fehily. The victory was the first in the race for owner, trainer and rider. Rock On Ruby was trained at Nicholls' satellite stable at Seaborough in Dorset, rather than his main yard at Ditcheat in Somerset, and much of the training was done by Harry Fry. 

Rock On Ruby won by three and three quarter lengths from Overturn. Two previous winners of the race, Hurricane Fly and Binocular finished third and fourth. All ten of the runners completed the course.

Race details
 Sponsor: Stan James
 Purse: £370,000; First prize: £210,715
 Going: Good
 Distance: 2 miles 110 yards
 Number of runners: 10
 Winner's time: 3m 50.10

Full result

 Abbreviations: nse = nose; nk = neck; hd = head; dist = distance; UR = unseated rider; PU = pulled up

Winner's details
Further details of the winner, Rock On Ruby.
 Sex: Gelding
 Foaled: 11 May 2005
 Country: Ireland
 Sire: Oscar; Dam: Scandisk (Tirol)
 Owner: The Festival Goers
 Breeder: John O'Dwyer

References

Champion Hurdle
 2012
Champion Hurdle
Champion Hurdle
2010s in Gloucestershire